The Myanmar Women's national volleyball team is the volleyball national women's team of Myanmar, represents Myanmar in international volleyball competitions and friendly matches.

References

Volleyball in Myanmar
National women's volleyball teams
Volleyball
Women's sport in Myanmar